The 2014 Canoe Sprint European Championships, was the 26th edition of the Canoe Sprint European Championships, an international canoe and kayak sprint event organised by the European Canoe Association, held in Brandenburg, Germany, between 10 and 13 July 2014.

Medal table

Medal overview

Men

Women

Paracanoe

Medal events
 Non-Paralympic classes

External links
Official Website
Results

Canoe Sprint European Championships
Canoe Sprint European Championships
European Sprint Championships
International sports competitions hosted by Germany
Sport in Brandenburg
Canoeing and kayaking competitions in Germany
21st century in Brandenburg
July 2014 sports events in Germany